Flavihumibacter stibioxidans is a gram-negative, strictly aerobic, rod-shaped and non-motile bacterium from the genus of Flavihumibacter which has been isolated from soil from the Lengshuijiang antimony mine in China.

References

External links
Type strain of Flavihumibacter stibioxidans at BacDive -  the Bacterial Diversity Metadatabase

Chitinophagia
Bacteria described in 2016